State Route 164 (SR 164) is a state highway passing through four counties in east-central Ohio. The route runs in a general southwest to northeast fashion, and is signed north–south accordingly. The southern part of the route serves more rural areas while it makes its way through larger villages and cities toward its northern end.

History
SR 164 was commissioned in 1923, routed from Salineville to Youngstown. The highway was reroute from North Lima to Youngstown along previous Route 7, in 1926. In 1937 the route was extended south to SR 43 in Amsterdam. The route was extended southeast to the current intersection at SR 212, south of Leesville, in 1938. Between 1977 and 1979 the northern terminus was relocated to the current interchange with I–680.

Major intersections

References

External links

164
Transportation in Mahoning County, Ohio
Transportation in Columbiana County, Ohio
Transportation in Carroll County, Ohio
Transportation in Jefferson County, Ohio